State Route 322 (SR 322) is a state highway in Lincoln County, Nevada. From State Route 321 in Pioche, State Route 322 passes by U.S. Route 93 and heads to the entrance of Spring Valley State Park via the community of Ursine. The route was previously known as State Route 85.

Route description
The route begins with an intersection with State Route 321. SR 322 heads northward through town as Main Street. Upon intersecting U.S. Route 93, the route becomes Eagle Valley Road, heading eastward. SR 322 then turns northward, passing briefly through the town of Ursine before meeting its terminus at Spring Valley State Park.

History
The route was the second highway in the state to be known as State Route 85, established in the 1970s. This designation was removed in favor of SR 322 in the 1976 renumbering of Nevada's state highways.

Major intersections

References

322
Transportation in Lincoln County, Nevada